Sakshatkara is a 1971 Kannada drama film directed by Puttanna Kanagal and starring Dr. Rajkumar , Jamuna , Prithviraj Kapoor and R. Nagendra Rao in the lead roles. This was third and final collaboration of Puttanna Kanagal and Rajkumar. Sundar Krishna Urs was the associate director of the movie.

Plot 
The story revolves around the dangers of superstition, particularly when it concerns marriage and how unscrupulous elements in society could manipulate these beliefs to their benefit and lead to tragic consequences.

Cast

Soundtrack
The music for the film was composed by M. Ranga Rao and lyrics was written by Kanagal Prabhakar Shastry.

Release
The film had a huge opening thanks to the grand success of Puttanna Kanagal-Dr. Rajkumar duo's previous ventures, Mallammana Pavada and Karulina Kare but soon fizzled out.

References

External links 
 

1971 films
1970s Kannada-language films
Films scored by M. Ranga Rao
Films directed by Puttanna Kanagal